The 2005 ACC Under-19 Cup was an international under-19 cricket tournament held in Nepal from 8 to 19 November 2005. The sixth ACC under-19 tournament to be held, matches were played in the capital Kathmandu and three other cities in the Kathmandu Valley, Bhaktapur, Kirtipur, and Lalitpur.

The number of teams at the tournament increased to fifteen (from the ten at the previous edition), with Afghanistan, Bahrain, Brunei, Iran, and Saudi Arabia making their debuts. Coached by Roy Dias and captained by Paras Khadka, Nepal defeated Malaysia in the final at Kirtipur's Tribhuvan University International Cricket Ground, with an estimated 10–15,000 people in attendance, as well as television viewership of 1.5 million. The team won its second consecutive title (and third overall), and consecutively qualified for the 2006 Under-19 World Cup in Sri Lanka. Kuwait and Qatar were the losing semi-finalists for the second tournament in a row. The leading runscorer at the tournament was Malaysian batsman Ariffin Ramly, while the leading wicket-taker was Hong Kong's Irfan Ahmed. The tournament's semi-finals and final were broadcast live on Nepal Television.

Group stages

Full fixtures:CricketArchive

Group A

Notes
 Group A was the only group to have three teams; all others had four.
 Bahrain scored 383/4 from 50 overs against Brunei, the highest team total of the tournament.
 Brunei were dismissed for 21 from 15.2 overs against Nepal, the lowest team total of the tournament.
 Two centuries were scored in Group A, both by Bahraini batsman against Brunei, with Gayan de Silva scoring 200 not out and Danish Jasnaik scoring 102 not out. De Silva's innings was the best individual batting performance at the tournament.
 One five-wicket haul was recorded in Group B, with Bahrain's Salman Sattar taking 8/15 against Brunei, the best individual bowling performance at the tournament.

Group B

Notes
 Two centuries were scored in Group B, both against Iran – Kuwait's Habibullah Iftikhar scored 153 and the UAE's Shehan Dharmasena scored 109.
 Four five-wicket hauls were recorded in Group B – Afghanistan's Sanaullah Mohib took 5/17 against Iran, the UAE's Shoaib Sarwar took 5/21 against Iran, Kuwait's Ali Shahzad also took 5/21 against Iran, and the UAE's Mohammad Fawad took 5/26 against Afghanistan.

Group C

Notes
 Two five-wicket hauls were recorded in Group C – Singapore's Jayanth Ganapathy took 5/38 against Qatar and Oman's Mushtaq Syed against Singapore.

Group D

Notes
 Three five-wicket hauls were recorded in Group D, all against the Maldives – Hong Kong's Irfan Ahmed took 6/15, Malaysia's Darvin Muralitharan took 5/5, and Saudi Arabia's Imran Nasir took 5/28.

Finals

Quarter-finals

Semi-finals

Final

Statistics

Most runs
The top five runscorers are included in this table, ranked by runs scored and then by batting average.

Source: CricketArchive

Most wickets

The top five wicket takers are listed in this table, ranked by wickets taken and then by bowling average.

Source: CricketArchive

Final standing

References 

Under-19 regional cricket tournaments
International cricket competitions in 2005
International cricket competitions in Nepal